Kenneth Sherrod Hayes (born April 16, 1987) is an American professional basketball player for Beirut Club of the Lebanese Basketball League. He attended and played college basketball for the Miami University of Ohio.

Professional career
Hayes went undrafted in the 2010 NBA draft. On November 1, 2010, he was selected by the Maine Red Claws in the 2010 NBA D-League Draft. On April 18, 2012, he was named the NBA Development League’s Most Improved Player for the 2011–12 season.

On August 5, 2012, he signed with Hapoel Gilboa Galil of Israel for the 2012–13 season. On August 8, 2013, he signed with Maccabi Ashdod for the 2013–14 season.

On July 23, 2014, Hayes signed with Vanoli Cremona of Italy for the 2014–15 season.

On August 3, 2015, Hayes signed with BC Astana of Kazakhstan. On March 7, 2016, he left Astana and signed with Unicaja Málaga of Spain for the rest of the 2015–16 ACB season.

On July 14, 2016, Hayes signed with Turkish club Demir İnşaat Büyükçekmece for the 2016–17 season.

On July 10, 2017, Hayes signed with French club Limoges CSP for the 2017–18 season. Hayes averaged 12.3 points per game on the season. He rejoined Büyükçekmece on July 10, 2018.

On January 15, 2021, he has signed with Gaziantep Basketbol of the Turkish Basketball Super League (BSL).

On August 10, 2021, he has signed with Pallacanestro Forlì 2.015 of the Serie A2 Basket.

On January 19, 2022, he has signed with HDI Sigorta Afyon Belediye of the Basketbol Süper Ligi (BSL).

On July 1, 2022, he has signed with Sigortam.net of the TBL.

References

External links
Eurobasket.com profile 
RealGM.com profile
FIBA.com profile

1987 births
Living people
Afyonkarahisar Belediyespor players
American expatriate basketball people in France
American expatriate basketball people in Israel
American expatriate basketball people in Italy
American expatriate basketball people in Kazakhstan
American expatriate basketball people in Spain
American expatriate basketball people in Turkey
American expatriate basketball people in Venezuela
American men's basketball players
Antalya Büyükşehir Belediyesi players
Basketball players from Dayton, Ohio
Baloncesto Málaga players
BC Astana players
Büyükçekmece Basketbol players
Hapoel Gilboa Galil Elyon players
Junior college men's basketball players in the United States
Liga ACB players
Limoges CSP players
Maccabi Ashdod B.C. players
Maine Red Claws players
Miami RedHawks men's basketball players
Point guards
Trotamundos B.B.C. players
Vanoli Cremona players